

Portugal
 Angola – Manuel de Almeida e Vasconcelos, Governor of Angola (1790–1797)
 Macau – Jose Manuel Pinto, Governor of Macau (1793–1797)

Kingdom of Great Britain
 New South Wales – John Hunter, Governor of New South Wales (1795–1800)

Colonial governors
Colonial governors
1795